Mohsenabad (also Romanized as Mohsenābād; also known as Mohsenābād-e Taheri) is a village in Bizaki Rural District, Golbajar District, Chenaran County, Razavi Khorasan Province, Iran. At the 2006 census, its population was 260, in 66 families.

References 

Populated places in Chenaran County